Espo or ESPO may refer to:

People
Stephen Powers (artist) ("Exterior Surface Painting Outreach"), a New York City artist known for graffiti
Phil Esposito (born 1942; nicknamed "Espo"), ice hockey player
Jesse Espo (born 1995), ice hockey player

Other uses
Espo (constructed language)
National-Socialist Patriotic Organisation (Ethniko-Socialistiki Patriotiki Organosis), a former Greek political party
Eastern Siberia – Pacific Ocean oil pipeline
European Sea Ports Organisation
Eastern Shires Purchasing Organisation, a public sector purchasing consortium in the UK

See also

 
 
 
 Espoo, a city in Finland
 Expo (disambiguation)